Inter-American can refer to:

Inter-American Biodiversity Information Network
Inter-American Conference
Inter-American Commission on Human Rights
Inter-American Court of Human Rights
Inter-American Defense Board
Inter-American Defense Board Medal
Inter-American Defense College
Inter-American Democratic Charter
Inter-American Development Bank
Inter-American Division of Seventh-day Adventists
Inter-American Economic Council
Inter-American Foundation
Inter-American Highway
Inter-American Institute for Global Change Research
Inter-American Magnet School
Inter-American League
Inter American Press Association
Inter American Regional Organisation of Workers, now Trade Union Confederation of the Americas
Inter-American Telecommunication Commission
Inter-American Treaty of Reciprocal Assistance
Inter-American University of Puerto Rico
Inter-American (train)
Inter-American Conventions:
Inter-American Convention Against Corruption
Inter-American Convention Against Racism and All Forms of Discrimination and Intolerance
Inter-American Convention Against Terrorism
Inter-American Convention against the Illicit Manufacturing of and Trafficking in Firearms, Ammunition, Explosives and Other Related Materials
Inter-American Convention on Forced Disappearance of Persons
Inter-American Convention on International Commercial Arbitration
Inter-American Convention on International Traffic in Minors
Inter-American Convention on Letters Rogatory
Inter-American Convention on Proof of and Information on Foreign Law
Inter-American Convention on Serving Criminal Sentences Abroad
Inter-American Convention on the Elimination of all Forms of Discrimination Against Persons with Disabilities
Inter-American Convention on the International Amateur Radio Permit
Inter-American Convention on the International Return of Children
Inter-American Convention on the Prevention, Punishment and Eradication of Violence against Women
Inter-American Convention on Transparency in Conventional Weapons Acquisition 
Inter-American Convention to Prevent and Punish Torture
The Inter-American Convention on Human Rights is correctly titled the American Convention on Human Rights